Hassani may refer to:

People
Hassani and al-Hassani is a given name and a surname, derived from the Arabic surname Hassan.

Given name
Hassani Alwan (born 1955), Iraqi footballer
Hassani Dotson Stephenson (born 1997), American soccer player
Hassani Gravett (born 1996), American basketball player
Hassani Shapi (born 1973), Kenyan actor, particularly active in Italian cinema

Middle name
Ahmad Hassani Baghdadi (born 1945), Iraqi Twelver Shi'a Marja
Ali Hassani Sefat, Iranian football player
Hossein Hassani Sa'di, Iranian regular military (Artesh) officer 
Mohsen Haji Hassani Kargar (1988–2015), Iranian Qari (reciter of Qur'an)
Shirin Hassani Ramazan (born 1980), Iraqi Kurdish politician

Surname
Ali El-Hassani (1897-????), Egyptian footballer
Bilal Hassani (born 1999), French singer, songwriter and YouTuber
Fahardine Hassani (born 1993), Comorian footballer
Farzad Hassani (born 1977), Iranian television presenter, actor and poet
Gholamreza Hassani (1927–2018), ayatollah in Iran 
Hajim al-Hassani (born 1954), Iraqi politician and speaker of the Iraqi National Assembly under the Iraqi Transitional Government
Hamid Hassani (born 1968), Iranian scholar and researcher
Hassan El-Hassani (1916-1987), Algerian comedian
Ilias Hassani (born 1995), Algerian footballer 
Iliass Bel Hassani (born 1992), Moroccan footballer 
Jan Alam Hassani (born 1956), Afghan volleyball player
Marwa Hassani (born 2002), French-born Moroccan footballer
Maryam Hassani (born 1993), Bahraini sports shooter
Mir Emad Hassani (1554–1615), Persian calligrapher
Mohamed Hassani, Egyptian paralympic athlete 
Mohammad Ali Tabatabaei Hassani (1945–2017), Iraqi Twelver Shia Muslim cleric (ayatollah)
Neda Hassani (1977-2003), Iranian protester who committed suicide by self-immolation
Ric Hassani (born 1989), Nigerian singer, songwriter and musician
Salih al-Hassani (politician), Iraqi independent politician and government minister
Salim Al-Hassani, Iraqi mechanical engineer and academic
Samya Hassani (born 2000), Dutch-born Moroccan footballer 
Shamsia Hassani (born 1988), Afghani artist and academic

Other uses
Hay El Hassani, a quartier of Casablanca, Morocco
Hassani, Bannu, a town and union council in Bannu District of Khyber-Pakhtunkhwa, Pakistan
Hassani Abdelkrim, a town and commune in Debila District, El Oued Province, Algeria
Hassani Airport, former name of Hellenikon Air Base, Athens, Greece
Hassaniya Arabic or Hassani, spoken in northern and northwestern Africa
Seyyed Hassani, in Shia Islam, a Sayyid whose rising is predicted to be among the signs of the reappearance of al-Mahdi

See also
Hassan (disambiguation)
Hassan (surname)
Hassania (disambiguation)

Patronymic surnames
Surnames from given names